Andrés Felipe Torres (born 13 March, 1975 in Palmira) is a Colombian sports shooter. He competed in the men's 10 metre running target event at the 2000 Summer Olympics.

References

2. Andrés Felipe Torres

External links
 

1975 births
Living people
Colombian male sport shooters
Olympic shooters of Colombia
Shooters at the 2000 Summer Olympics
People from Palmira, Valle del Cauca
Pan American Games medalists in shooting
Pan American Games gold medalists for Colombia
Pan American Games silver medalists for Colombia
Pan American Games bronze medalists for Colombia
Shooters at the 1995 Pan American Games
Shooters at the 1999 Pan American Games
Shooters at the 2003 Pan American Games
Medalists at the 1995 Pan American Games
Medalists at the 1999 Pan American Games
Sportspeople from Valle del Cauca Department
20th-century Colombian people
21st-century Colombian people